The University of Nottingham School of Pharmacy was founded in 1925 and is located in the University Park Campus of the university. The school also offers courses at the University's Malaysia campus in Kuala Lumpur with students spending two years in Malaysia and two years in Nottingham The School also offers the first joint Pharmacy course with China, with the Tianjin University of Traditional Chinese Medicine (TUTCM). The current head of The School is Professor Clive Roberts (2013-).

Courses 
The University of Nottingham School of Pharmacy off ers the following undergraduate courses, Master of Pharmacy (4-year and 5-year with integrated pre-reg), a 4-year MSci in Pharmaceutical Sciences with a year in industry, Medicinal and Biological Chemistry BSci Hons (Malaysia), as well as the five-year International Pharmacy programme with TUTCM. The School also offers a 1 and 2-year taught postgraduate MSc in Drug Discovery and Pharmaceutical Sciences along with an extensive postgraduate research programme.

Organisation of School of Pharmacy in the University Park Campus 
The School is based in three buildings within the main campus. 1. The School of Pharmacy building is the main teaching building and houses a teaching pharmacy, a complex for Pharmacy Leadership training, teaching laboratories and the Division of Pharmacy Practice and Policy. 2. The Biodiscovery Institute is a multidisciplinary research centre with several groups based there from the School from the Divisions of Biomolecular Science and Medicinal Chemistry and Regenerative Medicine and Cellular Therapies. School staff together with over 300 scientists from across seven different scientific disciplines work here to tackle key health priorities in drug discovery, cancer research, stem cell science, bacteriology and regenerative medicine. 3. The Boots Science Building is another research building, housing the Divisions of Advanced Materials and Healthcare Technologies and Molecular Therapeutics and Formulation. The EPSRC Advanced Therapeutics and Nanomedicines Doctoral Training Centre is housed in this building, and works in collaboration with UCL and a number of leading pharmaceutical industry partners to deliver PhD training in collaborative, fundamental, multidisciplinary and pharmaceutical focused research.

Rankings and Reputation 
The School of Pharmacy is ranked 6th in the world in the 2018 QS World Rankings for pharmacy and pharmacology and is the top UK School offering MPharm programmes. The School came joint 1st in the UK on quality of research for Pharmacy Schools in the 2014 Research Excellence Framework and is the only School of Pharmacy to have 100% of research at 4* (Internationally Leading) in the 'Impact on Society' category.

Ibuprofen is one of many medicines being widely used today which were invented in Nottingham. Prof Malcolm Stevens FRS, now Emeritus Professor in the School developed the anti-cancer drug Temozolomide whilst working at Nottingham and Aston University. It has been available in the US since August 1999, and in other countries since the early 2000s. A number of spin-outs have also come from the School, including Molecular Profiles Ltd, now Juniper Pharmaceuticals, Locate Therapeutics and Pharmaceutical Profiles now Quotient Clinical.

References

External links
 
 Special Professor – Ornella Barra

Pharmacy, School of
Pharmacy schools in the United Kingdom